George Bentham Morris (1839 – 16 April 1903) was a 19th-century Member of Parliament from the Gisborne and Bay of Plenty regions of New Zealand.

Early life
Morris was born in Oatlands, Tasmania, in 1839, the son of Susan Emma Waudby and Reverend George Sculthorpe Morris. He joined the marines after leaving school, and eventually arrived in New Zealand in 1870, settling in Auckland.

Political career

Morris represented the Tauranga electorate in the Auckland Provincial Council from 12 November 1873 until the abolition of provincial government on 31 October 1876. He represented the East Coast electorate in the House of Representatives from 1876 (when he was declared elected on a petition) to 1879, when he was defeated.

The  in the newly formed  electorate was hotly contested. Four candidates were nominated: Morris; William Kelly, who had also previously represented the East Coast electorate; George Vesey Stewart, then the owner of the Bay of Plenty Times; and Henry Thomas Rowe, a surveyor and commission agent. Rowe announced his retirement from the contest on 6 December three days out from election day, urging his supporters to vote for Stewart instead. The unofficial results were released the day after the election (Saturday, 10 December) and Morris had a majority of 13 votes over Stewart, with the official declaration to be made on 12 December. This was deferred until 14 December, with Morris ahead by 10 votes. Stewart stood for the Tauranga mayoralty a few months later and was elected the town's first mayor.

He represented the Tauranga electorate until 1885, when he resigned.

He was later a member of the Legislative Council, from 15 May 1885 until his death. He died at his home in Onehunga on 16 April 1903, aged 63, as a result of tripping and sustaining a blow to his temple. He was buried at Waikaraka Cemetery, Onehunga.

Notes

References

1839 births
1903 deaths
People from Tasmania
Australian emigrants to New Zealand
Members of the New Zealand House of Representatives
Members of the New Zealand Legislative Council
New Zealand MPs for North Island electorates
19th-century New Zealand politicians
Members of the Auckland Provincial Council
Burials at Waikaraka Cemetery